The 2008 Speedway Grand Prix of Sweden is the third race of the 2008 Speedway Grand Prix season. It took place on 24 May in the Ullevi Stadium in Göteborg, Sweden It is the fourth time that the Ullevi Stadium has staged a GP, the last time being the 2004 Grand Prix of Scandinavia. At 416 metres, the semi-permanent track is the largest track on the 2008 Grand Prix calendar, and the longest ever used for a Grand Prix event. 

Sweden is also the first of four rounds of the 2008 Super Prix. The meeting winner will be given the red helmet in the SuperPrix final at Gelsenkirchen in October with a chance of winning a share of an extra $200,000 prize fund.

Riders 
The Speedway Grand Prix Commission nominated Jonas Davidsson as a wild card, and Sebastian Aldén and Billy Forsberg both as track reserves. Bjarne Pedersen was again replaced by Luboš Tomíček because of an injury. The draw was made on 13 May at the FIM Headquarters in Mies, Switzerland.

 Draw No 13:  (11) Bjarne Pedersen →  (19) Luboš Tomíček, Jr.

Result 
Rune Holta won the Swedish Grand Prix with a fast overtaking manoeuvre on the back straight on the first lap of the final. It was Holta's 50th Grand Prix and the first Grand Prix win of his career.

Fredrik Lindgren had been unbeaten from his previous races but had to settle for second place, although he did score the most points from the meeting. Nicki Pedersen extended his series lead to ten points with third place. 

The meeting overran by over an hour due to a number of stoppages caused by the unpredictable, rutted track. Andreas Jonsson was taken to hospital after a high-speed crash but escaped serious injury, Niels Kristian Iversen also crashed in one of his heats and suffered a dislocated shoulder.

Heat details

Heat after heat 
 Crump, Jonsson, Nicholls, Kasprzak
 Holta, Pedersen, Andersen, Gollob
 Hancock, Iversen, Dryml, Davidsson (E/start)
 Lindgren, Adams, Harris, Tomicek
 Crump, Tomicek, Holta, Iversen (X/F2)
 Davidsson, Gollob, Harris, Kasprzak
 Lindgren, Jonsson, Pedersen, Hancock
 Andersen, Nicholls, Adams, Dryml
 Gollob, Adams, Crump, Hancock
 Lindgren, Holta, Dryml, Kasprzak
 Andersen, Harris, Jonsson, Alden
 Pedersen, Nicholls, Davidsson, Tomicek
 Pedersen, Crump, Dryml, Harris
 Hancock, Kasprzak, Tomicek, Andersen (F2)
 Jonsson, Adams, Davidsson, Holta
 Lindgren, Forsberg, Nicholls (X/F3), Gollob (X/F2)
 Lindgren, Davidsson, Crump, Andersen
 Kasprzak, Pedersen, Adams, Alden
 Gollob, Tomicek, Jonsson (X/F5), Dryml (X/F3)
 Holta, Nicholls, Harris, Hancock (X/F2)
 Semi-Finals:
 Lindgren, Holta, Adams, Jonsson (N)
 Pedersen, Crump, Andersen, Gollob
 Final:
 Holta (6), Lindgren (4), Pedersen (2), Crump (0)

The intermediate classification

See also 
 Speedway Grand Prix
 List of Speedway Grand Prix riders

References

External links 
 www.SpeedwayWorld.tv

Sweden
Speedway Grand Prix of Sweden
2008 in Swedish motorsport